Alexei Goncearov (born 24 February 1984) is a Moldovan former professional footballer.

External links

1984 births
Living people
Moldovan footballers
Association football defenders
Moldovan expatriate footballers
Expatriate footballers in Belarus
FC Sheriff Tiraspol players
FC Tiraspol players
CSF Bălți players
FC Dynamo Brest players
FC Rapid Ghidighici players
FC Tighina players